Mary Cameron may refer to:

Mary Cameron (painter) (1865–1921), Scottish portrait painter
Mary Gilmore (1865–1962), née Mary Cameron, Australian socialist poet and journalist
Mary Cameron (mother of David Cameron) (born 1934), mother of Prime Minister of the United Kingdom
Mary Cameron (entomologist), professor of medical entomology